Cyperus caesius is a species of sedge that is endemic to parts of northern South America.

The species was first formally described by the botanist Johann Otto Boeckeler in 1870.

See also
 List of Cyperus species

References

caesius
Taxa named by Johann Otto Boeckeler
Plants described in 1870
Flora of Venezuela